Tamara de Sousa (born 8 September 1993) is a Brazilian heptathlete. She competed in the women's heptathlon at the 2017 World Championships in Athletics, in London, England.

References

External links

1993 births
Living people
Brazilian heptathletes
World Athletics Championships athletes for Brazil
Place of birth missing (living people)
Athletes (track and field) at the 2010 Summer Youth Olympics
21st-century Brazilian people